Werner Christen (29 April 1914 – 2008) was a Swiss hurdler. He competed in the men's 400 metres hurdles at the 1948 Summer Olympics.

References

1914 births
2008 deaths
Athletes (track and field) at the 1948 Summer Olympics
Swiss male hurdlers
Olympic athletes of Switzerland
Place of birth missing